The Modern Touch is the second album by saxophonist Benny Golson featuring performances recorded in late 1957 and originally released on the Riverside label.

Reception
The Allmusic review by Scott Yanow states: "Excellent playing on an above-average set that defines the modern mainstream of 1957 jazz."

Track listing
All compositions by Benny Golson except as indicated
 "Out of the Past" - 6:22     
 "Reunion" (Gigi Gryce) - 7:14     
 "Venetian Breeze" - 5:38     
 "Hymn to the Orient" (Gryce) - 4:07     
 "Namely You" (Gene de Paul, Johnny Mercer) - 4:42     
 "Blues on Down" - 11:34

Personnel
Benny Golson - tenor saxophone
Kenny Dorham - trumpet 
J. J. Johnson - trombone  
Wynton Kelly - piano
Paul Chambers - bass
Max Roach - drums

References 

Riverside Records albums
Benny Golson albums
1958 albums
Albums produced by Orrin Keepnews